Phyllodactylus delsolari is a species of gecko, a lizard in the family Phyllodactylidae. The species is endemic to Peru.

Etymology
The specific name, delsolari, is in honor of Peruvian ornithologist Gustavo del Solar (1937–2008).

Geographic range
P. delsolari is found in the Peruvian Departments of Amazonas, Cajamarca, and La Libertad.

Habitat

Description

Reproduction
P. delsolari is oviparous.

References

Further reading
Aurich A, Koch C, Böhme W (2015). "Reproduction in a gecko assemblage (Squamata: Phyllodactylidae) in  the Marañon Region (Peru) and comments on the largest gecko in the New World". Phyllomedusa 14 (1): 53–62.
Venegas PJ, Townsend JH, Koch C, Böhme W (2008). "Two New Sympatric Species of Leaf-toed Geckos (Gekkonidae: Phyllodactylus) from the Balsas Region of the Upper Marañon Valley, Peru". Journal of Herpetology 42 (2): 386–396. (Phyllodactylus delsolari, new species).

Phyllodactylus
Reptiles of Peru
Reptiles described in 2008